Hudson is a city in St. Croix County, Wisconsin, United States. As of the 2010 United States census, its population was 12,719. It is part of the Minneapolis–St. Paul Metropolitan Statistical Area (MSA). The village of North Hudson is directly north of Hudson.

History

Hudson was settled in 1840 by Louis Massey and his brother in-law, Peter Bouchea. William Streets arrived at about the same time. Later that year, Joseph Sauperson (commonly known as Joe LaGrue) took up residence. These four are considered Hudson's original inhabitants. Massey and Bouchea settled at the mouth of the Willow River, near the present-day First and St. Croix Streets. They had been part of a group that lived for some time along the river below Fort Snelling, which appears on some old maps as "Massey's Landing".

Hudson was originally called Willow River. It was later named Buena Vista by Judge Joel Foster, founder of River Falls, after returning from the Mexican War where he fought in the Battle of Buena Vista. In 1852, Alfred D. Gray, Hudson's first mayor, petitioned to change the city's name to Hudson, because the bluffs along the St. Croix River reminded him of the Hudson River in his native New York.

A large number of settlers arrived in the 1850s and 1860s, many of whom were ancestors of today's residents. The lumber industry was the area's prime attraction, and over time sawmills were established throughout the St. Croix Valley.

The Chicago, St. Paul, Minneapolis and Omaha Railway was formed in 1881 from other railroads building between the Twin Cities and Chicago. The shops and headquarters of the Omaha Road were in Hudson. This route is now part of the Union Pacific Railroad.

On August 30, 1917, a violent mob of 1,000 held a night rally in front of the armory protesting the pacifist People's Council of America's attempt to hold a conference in Hudson's prizefighting arena. The crowd then moved on the four organizers in the lobby of their hotel and threatened to hang them. Only after the pleadings of county attorney N. O. Varnum were the four allowed to leave town at once and unharmed.

U.S. Highway 12 once crossed the St. Croix River on a toll bridge between Wisconsin and Minnesota, which provided revenue for the town. With the construction of Interstate 94, the toll bridge was removed, though the long causeway extending to the former bridge location is now open to the public as a pedestrian walkway, known as "The Dike".

Geography

Interstate Highway 94, U.S. Route 12 and Wisconsin Highway 35 are three of the main routes in the community.

Climate

Demographics

2010 census
As of the census of 2010, there were 12,719 people, 5,287 households, and 3,324 families living in the city. The racial makeup of the city was 94.8% White, 0.9% African American, 0.3% Native American, 1.4% Asian, 0.7% from other races, and 1.8% from two or more races. Hispanic or Latino of any race were 2.7% of the population.

There were 5,287 households, of which 32.6% had children under the age of 18 living with them, 49.0% were married couples living together, 9.9% had a female householder with no husband present, 4.0% had a male householder with no wife present, and 37.1% were non-families. 29.6% of all households were made up of individuals, and 10.4% had someone living alone who was 65 years of age or older. The average household size was 2.36 and the average family size was 2.95.

The median age in the city was 35.4 years. 25.3% of residents were under the age of 18; 6.7% were between the ages of 18 and 24; 32% were from 25 to 44; 23.4% were from 45 to 64; and 12.3% were 65 years of age or older. The gender makeup of the city was 48.5% male and 51.5% female.

2000 census
As of the census of 2000, there were 8,775 people, 3,687 households, and 2,271 families living in the city. The racial makeup of the city was 97.87% White, 0.22% Black or African American, 0.26% Native American, 0.46% Asian, 0.22% from other races, and 0.98% from two or more races. 1.04% of the population were Hispanic or Latino of any race.

There were 3,687 households, out of which 31.3% had children under the age of 18 living with them, 50.4% were married couples living together, 8.1% had a female householder with no husband present, and 38.4% were non-families. 29.1% of all households were made up of individuals, and 9.8% had someone living alone who was 65 years of age or older. The average household size was 2.35 and the average family size was 2.94.

In the city, the population was spread out, with 24.5% under the age of 18, 9.4% from 18 to 24, 34.8% from 25 to 44, 19.9% from 45 to 64, and 11.4% who were 65 years of age or older. The median age was 33 years. For every 100 females, there were 93.5 males. For every 100 females age 18 and over, there were 89.3 males.

The median income for a household in the city was $50,991, and the median income for a family was $63,953. Males had a median income of $42,108 versus $31,268 for females. The per capita income for the city was $26,921. About 1.7% of families and 3.5% of the population were below the poverty line, including 4.0% of those under age 18 and 5.3% of those age 65 or over.

Hudson's median household income in 2017 dollars was $69,035.

Economy
Hudson has grown as a tourist destination and restaurants on the St. Croix in its historic downtown, along with hotels and other businesses that serve traffic on Interstate Highway 94.

The former greyhound racing track, St. Croix Meadows, is being redeveloped to include a hotel, dining, commercial office space, residential condos, a baseball field, an 18-hole mini golf course, and an indoor sports complex with two hockey rinks and a soccer arena.

Two made-for-TV movies were filmed in the city in 2021.

Arts and culture
Hudson is home of the Phipps Center for the Arts, a regional performing arts center. It is the headquarters of Little Free Libraries and was the site of the first Little Free Library.

Public safety
Hudson is served by the Hudson Police Department, the Hudson Fire Department, and Lakeview EMS. These agencies respond to about 400 fire calls, 2000 EMS and rescue calls, and 5000 police calls annually.

Transportation
Hudson has no public airports, though residents have access to the New Richmond Regional Airport and the St. Paul Downtown Airport for general aviation, and the Minneapolis–Saint Paul International Airport (MSP) for commercial and international flights. There is an airport shuttle from Hudson to MSP.

Education
Hudson is served by the Hudson School District. Public schools in the city include E. P. Rock Elementary School, Hudson Prairie Elementary School, North Hudson Elementary School, Willow River Elementary School, Houlton Elementary School, River Crest Elementary School, Hudson Middle School, and Hudson High School.

St Patrick's School, a Catholic parochial school, is also in Hudson. The Trinity Academy of Hudson, a Lutheran private school, offers preschool through eighth grade.

In 2010, the University of Wisconsin–River Falls opened a satellite campus in Hudson with a focus on undergraduate and graduate degrees for adult students.

Notable people 
 
 Benjamin Allen, Wisconsin state senator
 Lynn H. Ashley, member of the Wisconsin State Assembly
 Julius Beer, member of the Wisconsin State Assembly
 Jim Bertelsen, National Football League player
 Todd Bol, Little Free Library founder
 Philo Boyden, member of the Wisconsin State Assembly
 George W. Chinnock, member of the Wisconsin State Assembly
 John A. Chinnock, member of the Wisconsin State Assembly
 Harvey Clapp, member of the Wisconsin State Assembly
 Moses E. Clapp, U.S. senator from Minnesota
 Otis Clymer, Major League Baseball player
 Richard H. Cosgriff, Medal of Honor recipient
 Thomas Cleland Dawson, diplomat
 Eliza B. K. Dooley, artist, writer, government official in Puerto Rico
 Davis Drewiske, professional hockey player
 James A. Frear, U.S. representative
 David C. Fulton, member of the Wisconsin State Assembly
 Marcus Fulton, Wisconsin state senator
 Phil Gallivan, baseball player
 Jay R. Hinckley, member of the Wisconsin State Assembly
 John Huot, member of the Minnesota House of Representatives
 James B. Hughes, politician, abolitionist, lawyer
 Donald L. Iverson, member of the Wisconsin State Assembly
 Andrew P. Kealy, member of the Wisconsin State Assembly
 Arthur D. Kelly, member of the Wisconsin State Assembly
 Max Malanaphy, drag queen
 Pamela Matson, Stanford scientist
 Frank Nye, U.S. representative from Minnesota
 Ted Odenwald, baseball player
 Wilder Penfield, neurosurgeon pioneer
 William Henry Phipps, Wisconsin state senator
 Thomas Porter, member of the Wisconsin State Assembly
 Bobby Reis, baseball player
 Kitty Rhoades, member of the Wisconsin State Assembly
 Barry Rose, professional football player
 Bjørn Selander, racing cyclist
 John Coit Spooner, United States senator
 Philip Loring Spooner, tenor singer
 Horace Adolphus Taylor, Wisconsin state senator
 Kraig Urbik, professional football player

References

External links

Hudson Chamber of Commerce and Tourism Bureau
Around the Corner with John McGivern -- Hudson Video produced by Milwaukee PBS

Cities in Wisconsin
Cities in St. Croix County, Wisconsin
County seats in Wisconsin
Populated places established in 1840
1840 establishments in Wisconsin Territory